House Spirits Distillery is an American craft distiller based in Portland, Oregon. It was founded in Corvallis in 2004 and moved to Portland in 2005. Its production facility and tasting room is located on Portland's Distillery Row, in the Central Eastside Industrial District. The distillery's flagship brand is Aviation American Gin, which comprised 80% of its production in 2012, and around 40% in 2016, after the company's move into a larger distillery facilitated a major expansion of production of its whiskey brand. 

Production of Westward Oregon Straight Malt Whiskey, made from malted barley grown in the Pacific Northwest, accounted for around 50% of the company's production in late 2016.  Other products include Krogstad Festlig aquavit and Volstead Vodka. Small-batch artisanal liqueurs from House Spirits have included Japanese-style shōchū and coffee liqueur.

In 2013, the company made plans to expand its distribution to 35 states in a deal with distributor Southern Wine & Spirits. The same year, House Spirits opened a second tasting room at Portland International Airport. Former NFL quarterback Joe Montana is an investor in the company.

In November 2015, House Spirits opened a new, larger distillery in Portland's Central Eastside Industrial District.  The $6 million,  facility, built almost entirely new, also included a tasting room. At the time, House said the expansion would enable them to double their production of American Aviation Gin and increase their production of Westward Oregon Straight Malt Whiskey tenfold.

In late 2016, the company sold its flagship brand, American Aviation Gin, to New York-based distributor Davos Brands, but the company continues to be the gin's sole distiller.

See also
List of distilleries in Portland, Oregon

References

External links
House Spirits Distillery (official website)

2004 establishments in Oregon
Manufacturing companies based in Portland, Oregon
Food and drink companies based in Portland, Oregon
Food and drink companies established in 2004
Distilleries in Oregon